Rosa Bielsa-Hierro (born 9 January 1966) is a Spanish former professional tennis player.

Biography
Bielsa competed in two Federation Cup ties for Spain, both in the 1985 edition, as the doubles partner of Ana Almansa. The pair won the deciding doubles rubber against Hong Kong, to advance to a second round fixture against Australia, which they and their teammates lost 0–3.

At the 1989 French Open she lost in the qualifying draw for the singles but featured in the main draw of the women's doubles, with Soviet player Eugenia Maniokova.

Bielsa won two medals for Spain at the 1991 Summer Universiade in Sheffield, a bronze in the singles and a bronze in the mixed doubles.

In 1996 she was a member of the Spanish women's team which finished runner-up in the Padel Tennis World Championship.

ITF finals

Singles (0–2)

Doubles (8–10)

See also
List of Spain Fed Cup team representatives

References

External links
 
 
 

1966 births
Living people
Spanish female tennis players
Universiade medalists in tennis
Universiade bronze medalists for Spain
Medalists at the 1991 Summer Universiade
20th-century Spanish women